Stephen Venables (born 2 May 1954) is a British mountaineer and writer, and is a past president of the South Georgia Association and of the Alpine Club.

Mountaineer
In 1988, Venables became the first Briton to ascend the summit of Mount Everest without bottled oxygen. His ascent, as far as the South Col, was by a new route up the Kangshung Face from Tibet, with just three other climbers, Americans Robert Anderson and Ed Webster, and Canadian Paul Teare. All four reached the South Col but Teare decided to descend from here, concerned about incipient altitude sickness. The other three continued up the final section of the normal 1953 route, but Anderson and Webster were forced to turn back at the South Summit. Meanwhile, Venables reached the summit alone, at 3.40 pm. Descending late in the day, he decided to bivouac in the open at about 8,600 metres, rather than risk a fall by continuing in the dark. Anderson and Webster spent the night slightly lower in an abandoned Japanese tent. In the morning all three were reunited and continued down to their own tents on the South Col. It took them a further three days to complete an epic retreat down the Kangshung Face. All three climbers suffered some frostbite, with Webster affected worst.

Venables's other Himalayan first ascents include new routes in the Hindu Kush (1977), Kishtwar Shivling (1983), Solu Tower (1987), the south-west ridge of Kusum Kanguru (1991) and Panch Chuli V (1992). During the descent from Panch Chuli V Venables broke both his legs in a fall, when an abseil anchor failed; thanks to his Indian and British teammates and the Indian Air Force, he was rescued. This expedition was recorded in his book A Slender Thread and in Victor Saunders's No Place to Fall. He has also made first ascents in Peru, Bolivia, Patagonia and South Georgia. He has appeared in several BBC television documentaries and the IMAX film Shackleton's Antarctic Adventure. He is currently president of the South Georgia Association and is a past President of the Alpine Club.

Personal life
Venables is the father of the only known child in the UK to be diagnosed with both autism and leukaemia. His son, Ollie (born June 1991), was diagnosed with autism aged two and leukaemia aged four. After several cancer-free years, he developed a brain tumour and died, aged twelve years old. His life was the subject of Venables's tenth book Ollie, published in 2006.

Awards and honors
1986 Boardman Tasker Prize for Mountain Literature, Painted Mountains: Two Expeditions to Kashmir
1996 Banff Mountain Book Festival (Grand Prize), Himalaya Alpine-Style: The Most Challenging Routes on the Highest Peaks
2007 Banff Mountain Book Festival (Best Book – Mountain Literature), Higher Than the Eagle Soars: A Path to Everest.

Books by Venables
 Painted Mountains: Two Expeditions to Kashmir, Mountaineers Press, 1987,
 Everest, Kangshung Face, Pan, 1991,
 Island at the Edge of the World: South Georgian Odyssey, Hodder and Stoughton, 1991,
 Everest – Alone at the Summit, Odyssey, 1996,
 (with Andy Fanshawe) Himalaya Alpine Style: The Most Challenging Routes on the Highest Peaks, Baton Wicks, 1999,
 A Slender Thread: Escaping Disaster in the Himalaya, Arrow, 2001,
 To the Top: The Story of Everest, Walker, 2004,
 Everest – Summit of Achievement Bloomsbury 2003
 Ollie: The True Story of a Brief and Courageous Life, Hutchinson, 2006,
 Voices from the Mountains, Reader's Digest, 2006,
 (with Chris Bonington) Meetings with Mountains: Remarkable Face-to-face Encounters with the World's Peaks, Cassell, 2006,
 Higher Than the Eagle Soars: A Path to Everest, Random House, 2007,

See also
List of 20th-century summiters of Mount Everest

References

External links
Venables interviewed on UKClimbing.com
Mount Everest Interview with Stephen Venables

1954 births
Boardman Tasker Prize winners
Living people
English mountain climbers
British mountain climbers
Presidents of the Alpine Club (UK)
British summiters of Mount Everest